William M. Welch was an American manufacturer from Maquoketa, Iowa notable for inventing the High school diploma.

References

People from Maquoketa, Iowa
American printers
Year of birth missing
Year of death missing
Place of death missing